The year 1869 in science and technology involved some significant events, listed below.

Events
 November 4 – The first issue of scientific journal Nature is published in London, edited by Norman Lockyer.

Chemistry

 March 6 – Dmitri Mendeleev makes a formal presentation of his periodic table to the Russian Chemical Society.
 June 15 – John Wesley Hyatt patents celluloid, in Albany, New York.
 July 15 – Hippolyte Mège-Mouriès files a patent for margarine (as oleomargarine) in France as a beef tallow and skimmed milk substitute for butter.
 German chemist Lothar Meyer makes a formal presentation of the revised and expanded version of his independently-created 1864 periodic table, „Die Natur der chemischen Elemente als Funktion ihrer Atomgewichte". 
 Publication of Adolphe Wurtz's Dictionnaire de chimie pure et appliquée begins in Paris.

Life sciences
 April 6 – The American Museum of Natural History is founded in New York.
 June 24 – Sea Birds Preservation Act passed in the United Kingdom, preventing killing of designated species during the breeding season, the first Act to offer any protection to British wild birds.
 Paul Langerhans discovers the pancreatic islets.
 Friedrich Miescher discovers deoxyribonucleic acid (DNA) in the pus of discarded surgical bandages. Found in the nuclei of cells, Miescher names it "nuclein".
 Neurasthenia is first published as a diagnosis in psychopathology by Michigan alienist E. H. Van Deusen of the Kalamazoo asylum followed a few months later by New York neurologist George Miller Beard.
 French missionary and naturalist Père Armand David receives the skin of a giant panda from a hunter, the first time this species has become known to a Westerner; he also first describes a specimen of the "pocket handkerchief tree", which will be named in his honor as Davidia involucrata.
 Alfred Russel Wallace publishes The Malay Archipelago.

Mathematics
 W. Stanley Jevons publishes The Substitution of Similars and has a "Logic Piano" constructed to work out problems in symbolic logic.
 Hermann Schwarz devises Schwarz–Christoffel mapping.

Technology
 Approximate date – Henry Christopher Mance develops a practical military heliograph in the British Raj.

Awards
 Copley Medal: Henri Victor Regnault
 Wollaston Medal for Geology: Henry Clifton Sorby

Births
 February 14 – C. T. R. Wilson (died 1959), Scottish winner of the Nobel Prize in Physics.
 February 27 – Alice Hamilton (died 1970), American physician.
 April 8 – Harvey Cushing (died 1939), American neurosurgeon.
 April 17 – Robert Robertson (died 1949), Scottish-born chemist.
 June 19 – Christopher Addison (died 1951), English anatomist and politician.
 July 18 – Maria von Linden (died 1936), German bacteriologist and zoologist.
 August 23 – Robert Gunther (died 1940), English historian of science.
 October 3 – Robert W. Paul (died 1943), English pioneer of cinematography.
 December 16 – Bertha Lamme (died 1943), American electrical engineer.
 Helen Boyle (died 1957), British physician and psychologist.

Deaths
 July 22 – John A. Roebling (born 1806), German American bridge engineer.
 September 11 – Thomas Graham (born 1805), Scottish chemist.

References

 
Science, 1869 In
1860s in science
19th century in science